Visage may refer to:

A synonym of face
Visage Mobile, an American software as a service company
Visage, Georgia, a community in the United States
Visage (film), also known as Face, a 2009 French film
Visage (video game), a survival horror game by SadSquare Studio.
"Visage", a 2003 episode of Smallville
Venus In Situ Atmospheric and Geochemical Explorer (VISAGE), a 2017 Venus lander proposal by NASA

Music
"Visage", a 1961 electro-acoustic work by Luciano Berio
Visage (band), a British pop group
Visage (Visage album), a 1980 album by Visage
"Visage" (song), a 1981 song by Visage
Visage (EP), a 1981 compilation EP by Visage
Visage (video), a 1986 compilation video by Visage
Visage (Rob Brown album), a 2000 album by jazz saxophonist Rob Brown
"Visage", a 1968 song by Nicoletta (singer)

People with the surname
Bertrand Visage, French writer
Michelle Visage, American singer and radio host